Ryūkōsai Jokei was a painter, illustrator, and designer of ukiyo-e-style Japanese woodblock prints in Osaka, who was active from about 1777 to 1809.  He was a student of Shitomi Kangetsu (1747–1797), who in turn was the son and pupil of Tsukioka Settei (1710–1786).  Ryūkōsai is considered to be either the founder or one of the founders of the Osaka school of ukiyo-e. He is best known for his portraits of actors.  His prints are mostly in the hosoban format.  
 
Pupils of Ryūkōsai include Shōkōsai Hanbei and Urakusai Nagahide.

Gallery

Notes

References
 Keyes, Roger S. & Keiko Mizushima, The Theatrical World of Osaka Prints, Philadelphia, Philadelphia Museum of Art, 1973, 238.
 Lane, Richard. (1978).  Images from the Floating World, The Japanese Print. Oxford: Oxford University Press. ;  OCLC 5246796
 Newland, Amy Reigle. (2005). Hotei Encyclopedia of Japanese Woodblock Prints.  Amsterdam: Hotei. ;  OCLC 61666175 
 Roberts, Laurance P. (1976). A Dictionary of Japanese Artists. New York: Weatherhill. ;  OCLC 2005932 

Ukiyo-e artists